Mohammad Ali Madadi (born 1959) is an Iranian politician.

Madadi was born in Meyaneh. He is a member of the 9th Islamic Consultative Assembly from the electorate of Meyaneh with Bahlul Hoseini. Madadi won with 44,855 (50.97%) votes.

References

External links
 Madadi Website

People from Mianeh
Deputies of Mianeh
Living people
1959 births
Members of the 9th Islamic Consultative Assembly
Followers of Wilayat fraction members